Kaviyoor Ponnamma is an Indian actress who appears in Malayalam films and television. She began her career performing in theatre dramas before foraying into cinema. She has also acted in TV serials and commercials and has playback singing credits in few films. Ponnamma is a four-time Kerala State Film Award for Second Best Actress winner. Her sister Kaviyoor Renuka was also an actress. Often called as the Mother to all actors, she has acted as mother of almost all actors in her career panning over decades. At the age of 20, she played the mother of Sathyan and Madhu in the 1965 movie Thommente Makkal. She gained critical acclaim for acting as the mother of the actor Mohanlal.

Life and career 

As a five-year-old, she learned music and used to sing in stage shows. She started acting in dramas when she was 14 years old with Mooladhanam by Thoppil Bhasi. After five years, came her first movie Kudumbini, in which she did the title role of the mother of two kids.

Personal life 

She was born to T. P. Damodharan and Gauri, as the eldest of seven children, on 10 September 1945 in Kaviyoor, Thiruvalla.  She has six siblings in which Kaviyoor Renuka (d. 2004), her younger sister, was also an actress.

Ponnamma was married to film producer Maniswami in 1969. The couple has a daughter Bindhu who is married and settled in United States. Ponnamma's  husband Maniswami died in 2011.

Awards

Kerala State Film Awards:

 Second Best Actress – 1971 – Different films
 Second Best Actress – 1972 – Theertha Yathra
 Second Best Actress – 1973 – Different films
 Second Best Actress – 1994 – Thenmavin Kombathu

Film City Magazine- Chalachitra Ratnam' Title - 2006

Pappanamkode Lakshmanan Award - 2006

O Madhavan Award - 2009

Bharath Murali Award - 2012

Kala Ratna award -  EV Kala Mandalam - 2013

PK Rosy Award - 2015

Good Knight Film and Business Awards - 2017

Gurupranam - Honour by Malayalam Cine Technicians’ Association (MACTA) - 2013

Honour by KSFDC - 2015

Honour by Kerala State Film Awards - 2016

Felicitation by Kerala State Film Awards - 2017

Kausalya Vandanam programme Honour - 2017

Kalaiselvam Award - Government of Tamil Nadu

Honour by Kaviyoor Panchayat
 
DLSA Honour

Filmography

As an actress

2010s

2000s

1990s

1980s

1970s

1950–1960s

As a movie playback singer
 1963 - "Kaavilamme Karinkali" - Kaattumaina
 1968 - "Methikkalathile" - Velutha Kathreena
 1972 - "Ambike Jagadambike" - Theerthayaathra
 1973 - "Mangalaam Kaavile" - Dharmayudham 
 1982 - "Thushaaramanikal" - Illakkangal
 1982 - "Palathum Paranju" - Chiriyo Chiri
 1999 - "Unknown"  - Pallavur Devanarayanan
 2001 - "Unnikkanna'' - Kakkakuyil

Television

Serials

 Gauri  (Surya TV)
 Amme Mahamayee (Surya TV)
 Nagamma
 Thatteem Mutteem (Mazhavil Manorama) - Cameo appearance 
 Ramayanam (Mazhavil Manorama)
 Kathayile Rajakumari (Mazhavil Manorama)
 Gajarajan Guruvayoor Kesavan (Surya TV)
 Sree Ayappanum Vavarum (Surya TV)
 Vishudha Thomasleeha (Asianet)
 Chandrettanum Shobedathiyum 
 Krishnakripaasaagaram (Amrita TV)
 Pakal Mazha (Amrita TV)
 Manthrakodi (Asianet)
 Ammathottil (Asianet)
 Alilathali (Asianet)
 Swantham Malootty
 Manassariyathe (Surya TV)
 Dambathya geethangal (Asianet)
 Sthree 2 (Asianet)
 Ponnunjal (Asianet)
 Black and White (Asianet)
 Meera (Asianet)
 Akkarappacha (Asianet)
 Mandan Kunju (Doordarshan)
 Manasi
 Akshayapaathram
 Kalanum Kandakashani (Doordarshan)
 Guruvayoor Sree Krishna Darsanam - Devotional show

Other programmes

 Home Sweet Home
 JB Junction
 News Hour
 Movies
 Arabian Dreams
 Cinema Diary
 Ponnamma Manassu
 Comedy Super Nite 
 Comedy Super Nite 2 
 Kathayillithu Jeevitham
Kayyoppu
 Ponnamma Manssu Thurakkunnu
 Malayalee House
 On Record
 Mukhamukham
 Samagamam
 FM Rainbow
Badayi Bungalow
 Female Film Festival
 Women in Action programme
 Onam Cooking Show (Kairali We)
 Thiranottam
 Top Talk
 CN Vlogs Onam 2019
 Kayyur Film
 Nithyaharitham Book release
 Ee Vazhitharayil
 Charithram Enniloode
 International Children’s Film Festival of Kerala (ICFFK) 
 Mathrusparsham
 KSFDC
 Valthsallyam
 Mothers’ Day programme
 K.G. Jayan Felicitation
 Aanachamayam
 Thombil Palace Samrakshana Samiti Programme
 Lohithadas Award Function
 65th Hindu Religious Meet
 Interview (Kairali TV)
 Onam Thoughts (Jaihind TV)
 Ammakkorumma
 Amma Ponnamma
 Cinemayile Amma Ponnamma
 Mohanam 2016
 Limelight
 Anjaloonjal
 Attukal festival
 Oru Vattam Koodi
 Stall at Desam
 Children's day Magic Show
 Prem Nazir film festival
 Media Award Presentation
 Swantham Gramam Sundara Gramam
 Amruthageethangal
 Film Supporting Artistes’ Welfare Association
 Good Knight Film and Business Awards 2017
 Annorikkal
 Nere Chovve
 Lal Salam
 Madhuram Madhuram Onam
 Comedy Stars
 Onathammamar
 Star Singer
 Red FM Malayalam Music Awards
 Thanima Cultural Festival
 Ormayile Ponnonam
 JC Daniel Award - Jury
 Katha Ithuvare
 Amma Nakshathram
 Chapter Day
 Mathrumadhuram Onam 
 Prem Nazir Foundation Award
 50 years of Vellithirayile Perunthachan
 Janaseva Sisu Bhavan Snehaveedu
 Honour to IV Sasi
 Minnalai Television Award Night
 Velicham Intensive Educational Development Project
 Vishu Interview (Jaihind TV)
 Run Kerala, Run
 Golden Jubilee celebrations of the formation of the State
 Krishna Jayanthi
 Hiroshima Day Programme
 Jubilee Fete of the Neeravil Prakash Kala Kendram
 Bharathan's 10th death anniversary

Drama

As drama actress
 Mooladhanam
 Puthiya Akasham Puthiya Bhoomi
 Janani Janmbhoomi
 Doctor

As a drama singer
 "Vellilam Kaattilolichu Kalikkuvan"
 "Pookkaara Pootharumo" (Doctor)
 "Onappooviliyil" (Mooladhanam)
 "Kaalchilambil" (Mooladhanam)
 "Oru vazhithaarayil" (Althara)
 "Pottichirichu"
 "Mannil Piranna"(Althara)
 "Mulchedikkaattil"(Althara)
 "Vala Vala"(Althara)
 (Yagashala)
  (Maya)

Albums
 Karyasiddhi Pooja
 Ente Malayalam
 Sreeramajapam
 Makam - (Singer)
 Ellam Ente Chottanikkara Amma - (Singer)
 Krishna Krishna Hare Hare - (Singer)

Advertisements
 Sreelakshmi General & Pooja Store Payyoli
 Fawaz Wedding Centre
 Manohar Jewellers
 Kalabhacharthu 
 Joy Alukkas Wedding Center
 Santhimadam Villa
 Sreenivas Idli and Dosa Powder
 Mas Curry Powder
 Siva Emu

References

External links

 
 Kaviyoor Ponnamma at MSI

Indian film actresses
Actresses in Malayalam cinema
Kerala State Film Award winners
Living people
Actresses from Kerala
People from Pathanamthitta district
1945 births
20th-century Indian actresses
21st-century Indian actresses
Actresses in Malayalam television
Indian television actresses
Indian stage actresses
Actresses in Malayalam theatre
Indian women playback singers
20th-century Indian singers
21st-century Indian singers
Singers from Kerala
20th-century Indian women singers
21st-century Indian women singers
Film musicians from Kerala
Women musicians from Kerala
Actresses in Tamil cinema